Uecker-Randow-Tal is an Amt in the district of Vorpommern-Greifswald, in Mecklenburg-Vorpommern, Germany. The seat of the Amt is in Pasewalk, itself not part of the Amt.

The Amt Uecker-Randow-Tal consists of the following municipalities:

 Brietzig
 Fahrenwalde
 Groß Luckow
 Jatznick
 Koblentz
 Krugsdorf
 Nieden 
 Papendorf 
 Polzow
 Rollwitz 
 Schönwalde 
 Viereck 
 Zerrenthin 

Ämter in Mecklenburg-Western Pomerania